LGBT tourism in South Africa is a form of niche tourism marketed to gay, lesbian, bisexual and transgender (LGBT) people who visit South Africa. Cape Town is the most popular destination for LGBT tourists in South Africa and is regarded as the gay capital of Africa, hosting the Cape Town Pride festival in February/March, the Mother City Queer Project in December, and the Out in Africa Film Festival in September/October every year. Other regional events include the Pink Loerie Mardi Gras in Knysna, Western Cape.

Cape Town
Cape Town's popularity as an LGBT tourism destination within South Africa is due in large part to its natural beauty, white sandy beaches, mild climate and a strong post-apartheid culture of tolerance.  The liberal, post 1994, South African constitution enshrines the rights of individuals regardless of race, sex, religion or sexual preference.

De Waterkant, the area alongside the city centre en route to the Cape Town Stadium, is a gay village with a high concentration of guest houses, hotels, pubs and clubs.  The area is the epicentre of the Cape Town Pride festival and a good place any time to watch the parade.  Other attractions include the city's abundance of good restaurants and its close proximity to the winelands of the Boland and Constantia Valley.

See also

LGBT events in South Africa
LGBT cruises

References

LGBT in South Africa
South Africa
Tourism in South Africa